Indocalamus latifolius is an East Asian species of bamboo in the genus Indocalamus.

References

Bambusoideae
Grasses of Asia